The 2011 Wollongong floods, beginning in March 2011, were a series of floods occurring throughout  and the Illawarra regions of New South Wales, Australia. The floods were the result of a storm cell covering most of the southern regions of the state and torrential rain in suburban Sydney and nearby regional areas.

Sixteen pre-school children and their carers were rescued at Jamberoo by the State Emergency Service. Albion Park received  of rain in the hour leading up to 1 pm on 21 March 2011. Dozens of people were rescued as highways were shut and trains suspended until the waters subsided.

The Bureau of Meteorology issued flash flood warnings for the South Coast, Riverina, Illawarra, South West Slopes, Snowy Mountains and Southern Tablelands, with heavy rain expected to continue. In the first 48 hours of the flood (20–21 March)  of rain has fallen in Wollongong. Robertson in the Southern Highlands recorded the state's highest rainfall on 21 March with  equalling the March record for 2003.

The Princes Highway was closed around Station Street, Albion Park and at Kiama after a tree fell and blocked the road. The Southern Freeway was closed at Berkeley and the Illawarra Highway was also closed.

See also

Floods in New South Wales

References

Wollongong floods
Wollongong floods
Floods in New South Wales
Weather events in Australia
2010s in New South Wales
Wollongong
2011 disasters in Australia